Buckhalter is a surname, being an Americanized form of the surname Buchhalter. Notable people with the surname include:

Correll Buckhalter (born 1978), American former football running back
Joe Buckhalter (1937-2013), American basketball player